Chloe Scheer (born 7 October 1999) is an Australian rules footballer playing for the Geelong Football Club in the AFL Women's (AFLW).

Early life and state football
Scheer was a talented underage cricketer, classed as a top order batswoman. She played four years for the Gawler Centrals all-boys cricket team, after which she transferred to Northern Jets and played there for six years. Since the age of 12 she played in Grade A teams, and won two Grand Finals. She also represented South Australia's state team in 2010, 2012, and 2015.

Despite being turned away by her club due to her not being male, Scheer stayed determined to play football and joined Salisbury West's under-16 team. With them she won a premiership, and after a year there joined Modbury, where she played her junior football. She won the Rell Smith Medal, the medal given to the under-18 best and fairest in the South Australian Women's Football League (SAWFL), three consecutive times in the years 2015–2017. In 2016, she also won the Dutschke Medal, the medal given to the senior best and fairest in the SAWFL. Scheer was also a key player for North Adelaide in the inaugural season of the SANFL Women's League in 2017. She was one of North Adelaide's best players in the Grand Final, which they lost to Norwood. At the 2017 AFL Women's Under 18 Championships, Scheer represented South Australia and was selected for the initial squad of the All-Australian team.

AFL Women's career
Scheer was supposed to be drafted in the 2017 AFL Women's draft, but ruptured her left anterior cruciate ligament late in the season. Following rehabilitation, she was drafted by Adelaide with their third selection and thirty-seventh overall in the 2018 AFL Women's draft. She made her debut in the one point loss to the Western Bulldogs at Norwood Oval in the opening round of the 2019 season. In round 5 of the season, she was nominated for the 2019 AFL Women's Rising Star award. Scheer played in the 2019 AFL Women's Grand Final, in which Adelaide claimed their second premiership. During the match, she suffered another anterior cruciate ligament injury, this time to her right knee. Following the 2019 season, Adelaide re-signed Scheer on a two-year contract.

Personal life
Scheer was born in Gawler, South Australia and went to school at Gawler and District College. Her older sister, Abbey Scheer plays football for Payneham Norwood Union Football Club.

She officially requested a trade to Geelong on 29 May 2021.

References

External links 

1999 births
Living people
Adelaide Football Club (AFLW) players
Australian rules footballers from South Australia
Geelong Football Club (AFLW) players